Jodok Seitz, O. Praem. (died 1471) was a Roman Catholic prelate who served as Auxiliary Bishop of Augsburg (1460–1471).

Biography
Jodok Seitz was ordained a priest in the Order of Canons Regular of Prémontré. In 1460, he was appointed during the papacy of Pope Pius II as Auxiliary Bishop of Augsburg and Titular Bishop of Adramyttium. On 27 May 1464, he was consecrated bishop by Peter von Schaumberg, Bishop of Augsburg, with Johannes Frey, Auxiliary Bishop of Freising, and Ulrich Aumayer, Auxiliary Bishop of Regensburg, serving as co-consecrators. He served as Auxiliary Bishop of Augsburg until his death on 23 Jan 1471.

References 

15th-century Roman Catholic bishops in Bavaria
Bishops appointed by Pope Pius II
1471 deaths
Premonstratensian bishops